Bucinch or Buc-Innis (Scottish Gaelic: "Buck Island" or "Male Goat Island") is a small island in Loch Lomond, in west central Scotland.

Along with smaller neighbour, Ceardach, Bucinch was donated to the National Trust for Scotland by Col Charles L Spencer of Warmanbie, Dumfries, in 1943. Although uninhabited for centuries, there are remains of a stone jetty.

Footnotes

External links
 https://web.archive.org/web/20090710015304/http://lochlomond-islands.com/
 Article which mentions it

Islands of Loch Lomond
National Trust for Scotland properties
Uninhabited islands of Stirling (council area)